The Trondheim Synagogue in Trondheim, Norway is the second-northernmost synagogue in the world (after the synagogue in Fairbanks, Alaska). The present synagogue has served the Jewish community since its inauguration on October 13, 1925. It was built to replace the first synagogue in Trondheim, the St Jørgensveita Synagogue, which was opened in 1899.

See also
 Oslo Synagogue
 Jewish Museum in Oslo
 History of the Jews in Norway
 The Holocaust in Norway

References

External links
The Jewish Community of Trondheim

1925 establishments in Norway
Ashkenazi Jewish culture in Europe
Ashkenazi synagogues
Buildings and structures in Trondheim
Reform Judaism in Europe
Reform synagogues
Synagogues completed in 1925
Synagogues in Norway